Winfred Kabunda is a Zambian boxer. He competed in the men's featherweight event at the 1980 Summer Olympics.

References

External links
 

Year of birth missing (living people)
Living people
Zambian male boxers
Olympic boxers of Zambia
Boxers at the 1980 Summer Olympics
Boxers at the 1982 Commonwealth Games
Commonwealth Games bronze medallists for Zambia
Commonwealth Games medallists in boxing
Place of birth missing (living people)
Featherweight boxers
Medallists at the 1982 Commonwealth Games